The Kampung Batu station is a Malaysian commuter and Rapid transit train station located in the west side of and named after the village of Kampung Batu (Batu Village) in northern Kuala Lumpur, Malaysia. It was built on the location of the disused colonial-era Batu Village railway station. The station is served by the KTM Komuter Seremban Line and the Putrajaya Line

KTM Komuter

History 

The station was constructed between the Batu Caves and the Sentul railway stations as part of a single-track, unelectrified line. It fell into disuse as with the rest of the portion of the railway line from Sentul to Batu Caves. During the Sentul Raya masterplan by YTL Corporation Berhad, the Kampung Batu station was demolished, and rebuilt for the KTM Komuter Port Klang-Sentul line extension. 

Upon completion in July 2010, the station was served by the Port Klang Line which ran from Port Klang to Batu Caves. In December 2015, following a change in the services of the KTM Komuter, the portion of the railway line between Sentul and Batu Caves stations including Kampung Batu station was transferred to the Seremban Line, with trains now running between Pulau Sebang/Tampin and Batu Caves stations.

MRT Putrajaya Line 

A station serving the Putrajaya line was constructed next to the existing KTM Komuter station. Under Phase One operations of the line, this station is temporarily the last station on the line, pending completion of the Kampung Batu-Putrajaya stretch.

The Kampung Batu MRT station commenced operations on 16 June 2022 at 3pm.

Feeder buses 

Go KL City Bus  (to Sentul LRT station) and Rapid KL  (Jalan Kampung Batu exit) and serve here.

External links
 KL MRT Integration with KTM Komuter Station

Railway stations in Selangor
Railway stations opened in 2010
Rapid transit stations in Selangor
Seremban Line